The Brande House is a historic house in Reading, Massachusetts.  Built in 1895, the house is a distinctive local example of a Queen Anne Victorian with Shingle and Stick style features.  It was listed on the National Register of Historic Places in 1984.

Description and history
The Brande House stands just west of downtown Reading, at the southwest corner of Summer and Linden Street.  It is a -story wood-frame structure, with a gabled roof and exterior clad in wooden shingles and clapboards.  Gabled sections project from either side, with a large porch in the corner created by the section on the right, where the main entrance is located, and a smaller porch on the corner on the left, facing Linden Street.  The right-hand porch is covered by a hip roof, supported by round columns, and has a simple balustrade with square balusters. The front facade is two bays wide, with a brick chimney rising at the center, flanked by two-story polygonal bays.  The gable above has a recessed porch and applied Stick style woodwork.  The left side gable section has three round windows in the gable, and the porch has a Stick style balustrade.

The house was built in 1895 by Dr. Mahlon Brande, a local dentist who also invested in real estate.  Its first documented resident, Fred Sperry, was a merchant selling furniture and rugs at a shop in Boston.

See also
National Register of Historic Places listings in Reading, Massachusetts
National Register of Historic Places listings in Middlesex County, Massachusetts

References

Houses on the National Register of Historic Places in Reading, Massachusetts
Houses in Reading, Massachusetts
1895 establishments in Massachusetts
Houses completed in 1895